Thomas von Randow (26 December 1921  Breslau, Schlesien – 29 July 2009  Hamburg)  was a German mathematician and journalist who published mathematical and logical puzzles under the pseudonym Zweistein in the "Logelei" column in Die Zeit. (After 2005 his column and pseudonym were continued by Bernhard Seckinger and Immanuel Halupczok.)

Publications

Many of his logic puzzles were published in the following books:
 99 Logeleien von Zweistein. Christian Wegner, Hamburg 1968
 Neue Logeleien von Zweistein. Hoffmann und Campe, Hamburg 1976
 Logeleien für Kenner. Hoffmann und Campe, Hamburg 1975
 88 neue Logeleien. Nymphenburger, München 1983
 87 neue Logeleien. Rasch und Röhring, Hamburg 1985
 Weitere Logeleien von Zweistein. Deutscher Taschenbuchverlag (dtv), München 1985, 
 Zweisteins Zahlenmagie. Mathematisches und Mystisches über einen abstrakten Gebrauchsgegenstand. Von Eins bis Dreizehn. Illustrationen von Gerhard Gepp. Christian Brandstätter, Wien 1993, 
 Zweisteins Zahlen-Logeleien. Insel, Frankfurt am Main und Leipzig 1993,

References
 Interview in Die Zeit, 15 November 2005
 Thomas von Randow – Visionär seines Fachs.  Obituary in Die Zeit,  32/2009

External links
 Logelei puzzle by Zweistein in Die Zeit
 Collection of logical puzzles by  Zweistein (in German)
Index to articles by Thomas von Randow  in Die Zeit

20th-century German mathematicians
Mathematics writers
Recreational mathematicians
Mathematics popularizers
Scientists from Wrocław
1921 births
2009 deaths
People from the Province of Lower Silesia
21st-century German mathematicians